Claude Warner (31 March 1882 – 29 December 1965) was a Welsh cricketer. He was a right-handed batsman and a right-arm medium-pace seam bowler.

Warner played his club cricket for Carmarthenshire, his most notable in 1920 against future team Glamorgan, for whom he was only called up in just a single first-class match, during the 1923 County Championship season. However, Glamorgan lost by an innings margin, and Warner, aged 41 by this time, was never called up again to the Glamorgan side.

By trade, Warner was a stockbroker, and took up cricket in his spare time, playing at club level either side of the First World War.

External links

1882 births
1965 deaths
Welsh cricketers
Glamorgan cricketers
Carmarthenshire cricketers